Liu Ts'ui-jung (born 5 December 1941) is a Taiwanese historian.

Born in 1941, Liu attended National Changhua Girls' Senior High School in her hometown of Changhua. She graduated from National Taiwan University with a bachelor's degree in history in 1963, and commenced graduate study at NTU, earning her first master's degree in 1966. Liu worked as a research fellow at Academia Sinica until receiving a scholarship from the Harvard–Yenching Institute.  She earned a second master's degree, followed by a doctorate at Harvard University. Liu returned to Academia Sinica after finishing her doctoral studies. She has taught as an associate professor at Soochow University and NTU, where she was promoted to full professor in 1980. Liu held several visiting fellowships and professorships throughout her career. She was elected a member of Academia Sinica in 1996, and remained a research fellow there until 2015.

Liu was elected a board member of the Chiang Ching-kuo Foundation in 2000, and appointed one of three vice presidents of the Academia Sinica under Wong Chi-huey in 2006, alongside Andrew Wang and Liu Chao-Han. In March 2013, Liu lost NT$20 million in a case of telephone fraud.

References

1941 births
Living people
Taiwanese women historians
20th-century Taiwanese historians
21st-century Taiwanese historians
People from Changhua County
National Taiwan University alumni
Harvard University alumni
Academic staff of the National Taiwan University
Academic staff of Soochow University (Taiwan)
Members of Academia Sinica
20th-century Taiwanese women writers
21st-century Taiwanese women writers